Michael Berrer was the defending champion but chose not to defend his title.

Adrián Menéndez-Maceiras won the title after defeating Roberto Quiroz 6–4, 3–6, 6–3 in the final.

Seeds

Draw

Finals

Top half

Bottom half

References
Main Draw
Qualifying Draw

Torneo Internacional Challenger León - Singles
2017 Singles